Aaland is a surname. Notable people with the surname include:

Jacob Aaland (1865-1950), Norwegian historian
Mikkel Aaland (born 1952), Norwegian-American photographer
Per Knut Aaland (born 1954), Norwegian cross country skier

See also 
 Åland
 Aland (disambiguation)

Surnames of Norwegian origin